The Treaty of Waitangi Act 1975 established the Waitangi Tribunal and gave the Treaty of Waitangi recognition in New Zealand law for the first time. The Tribunal was empowered to investigate possible breaches of the Treaty by the New Zealand government or any state-controlled body, occurring after 1975. It was also empowered to recommend, but not enforce, remedies.

Although the Treaty had been a focus of Māori activism for several years, many Māori were disappointed in the efficacy of the Waitangi Tribunal. Most of the significant breaches of the Treaty, such as land confiscation in the New Zealand Wars, had occurred in the nineteenth century, and the Tribunal was powerless to investigate these.

Amendments

1985 Amendment

The act created a Tribunal to investigate claims dating back to 1840, when the Treaty was signed. It also enlarged the Tribunal's membership to enable it to handle the increased number of claims. It also required the Tribunal to have a Māori majority.

The 1985 amendment considerably broadened the scope of the Tribunal's inquiries and led to ongoing debate over the appropriate response by the Crown to the findings and recommendations of the Tribunal (see Treaty of Waitangi claims and settlements). It was part of the Fourth Labour government's policy of giving greater acknowledgment to the Treaty, as was the inclusion of references to the Treaty in other legislation, such as the State-Owned Enterprises Act 1986. This amendment was one of the most important steps towards making the Treaty relevant in New Zealand law and society.

1988 Amendment

This further expanded the Tribunal's membership and abolished the requirement for a Māori majority. It also enabled different groups of Tribunal members to investigate different claims simultaneously.

1988 Amendment (State Enterprises)

This amendment came about following a court case in which the government was found to be ignoring the principles of the Treaty by attempting to sell state-owned land which might be subject to Treaty claims. The amendment enabled covenants to be placed on such land stating that it might be claimed back by the Tribunal, even if in private hands. It also gave the Tribunal the power to compulsorily acquire such land. This is the only instance in which the Tribunal is able to issue legally binding orders.

1993 Amendment

This amendment came about following the controversial recommendation in the Waitangi Tribunal's Te Roroa Report that the Crown purchase an area of private land for return to claimants in a settlement. The owners of the land argued that the recommendation devalued their properties.  The amendment prohibits the Tribunal from recommending the return or purchase by the Crown of any private land, other than that covered by the covenants noted above.

2006 Amendment (Māori Purposes Bill)

This amends section 6 of the Treaty of Waitangi Act to set a closing date of 1 September 2008 for submitting historical Treaty claims, defined as those relating to acts or omissions of the Crown prior to 21 September 1992.  It allows existing claims to be amended and does not affect the settlement of historical claims that have already been lodged, or the ability to lodge claims relating to grievances relating to acts or omissions after September 1992.

Other amendments

Legislation implementing various historical Treaty settlements amends section 6 of the Treaty of Waitangi Act to exclude the jurisdiction of the Waitangi Tribunal from further considering the historical claims of the group receiving the settlement.

2014 Tribunal Findings 
In response to the Te Paparahi o Te Raki (Wai 1040) inquiry, the Waitangi Tribunal concluded  in 2014 that Māori never conceded their sovereignty in the 1840 treaty as part of Stage One of their inquiry. Stage Two of the inquiry will consider events after 1840.

Debates

New Zealand Parliamentary Debates vol.395 (1974), pp. 5795–9.
New Zealand Parliamentary Debates vol.401 (1975), pp. 4342–6, 4495-500.
New Zealand Parliamentary Debates vol.402 (1975), pp. 5406–8.
New Zealand Parliamentary Debates vol.460 (1984–85), pp. 2702–13, 6059-83, 8626-31.
New Zealand Parliamentary Debates vol.485 (1987), pp. 1715–34.
New Zealand Parliamentary Debates vol.488 (1988), pp. 3970–81, 4017-28.
New Zealand Parliamentary Debates vol.489 (1988), pp. 4560–86, 4775-91.
New Zealand Parliamentary Debates vol.492 (1988), pp. 6611–16.
New Zealand Parliamentary Debates vol.494 (1988), pp. 7927–33, 8217-24.
New Zealand Parliamentary Debates vol.495 (1988), pp. 8525–35, 8861-72.
New Zealand Parliamentary Debates vol.632 (2006), pp. 3951–69.
New Zealand Parliamentary Debates vol.636 (2006), pp. 6965–84, 7021-33.

References

Treaty of Waitangi
Māori politics
1975 in New Zealand law
Statutes of New Zealand
Aboriginal title in New Zealand